NA-59 Chakwal-cum-Talagang is a constituency for the National Assembly of Pakistan.

Members of Parliament

1988–2002: NA-44 Chakwal-II

2002–2018: NA-61 Chakwal-II

2018-2022: NA-65 Chakwal-II

Election 2002 

General elections were held on 10 October 2002. Muhammad Faiz, an independent candidate, won by 101,664 votes.

Election 2008 

The result of general election 2008 and by-elections on 20 October 2010 in this constituency is given below.

Result 
Muhammad Faiz Tamman succeeded in the election 2008 and Sardar Mumtaz Tamman succeeded in By-elections and became the member of National Assembly.

 
Though Faiz Tamman resigned in 2010 due to degree issues. By-elections were conducted in Na-61 on 20 October 2010. There were eight candidates. The front two runners were Sardar Mumtaz Khan Tamman (votes=104739) & Sardar Mansoor Hayat Tamman (votes=37978). Mumtaz tamman won the by-elections by a very huge margin and is MNA NA-61.

Election 2013 

General elections were held on 11 May 2013. Sardar Mumtaz Khan of PML-N won by 114,282 votes by defeating Chaudhry Pervaiz Elahi  and became the  member of National Assembly.

Election 2018 
General elections were held on 25 July 2018. Chaudhry Pervaiz Elahi of Pakistan Muslim League (Q) won the election but vacated this constituency in favor of speakership of Punjab Assembly.

By-election 2018

By-elections were held in this constituency on 14 October 2018.

See also
NA-58 Chakwal
NA-60 Jhelum-I

References

External links 
Election result's official website
Delimitation 2018 official website Election Commission of Pakistan

65
65